Roșiorii de Vede (sometimes Roșiori de Vede or, in old versions, Rușii de Vede) is a city in Teleorman County, Romania. Located in the Muntenia region, it is one of the oldest cities in the country. It was first mentioned in a document which dates back to 1385, when the city was visited by two German pilgrims who were returning from Jerusalem and stopped for a few days in a town they called Russenart.

Geography
The city is situated in the middle of the Wallachian Plain, on the banks of the Vedea River and its right tributary, the Bratcov.

It neighbors the following communes: Măldăeni to the west,  Peretu and Troianul to the south, Vedea and Drăgănești de Vede to the east, and Scrioaștea to the north.

Transportation
Roșiorii de Vede is traversed by the national road DN6, which links Bucharest,  to the east, to the Banat region in western Romania. 

The Roșiorii de Vede train station serves the CFR Line 900, with service towards Costești, Turnu Măgurele, and Alexandria–Zimnicea.

Education

The Anastasescu National College is a high school that opened in 1919; the school building is listed as a historic monument by Romania's Ministry of Culture and Religious Affairs.

Natives
Several Romanian personalities were born in and around the city. These include: 
 Anton Berindei
 
 
 Alexandru Depărățeanu
 Stephan Drăghici
 Marin Ferecatu
 Liviu Floricel
 Gala Galaction
 Nicolae Gheorghe
 Radu Grămăticu
 
 Iulian Miu
 Robert Neciu
 Marin Preda
 Zaharia Stancu
 
 Claudiu Tămăduianu

References

External links 

 Roșiori de Vede City Hall site
 Roșiori de Vede Community site

Cities in Romania
Populated places in Teleorman County
Localities in Muntenia